Alenquer Municipality may refer to:

 Alenquer Municipality, Portugal
 Alenquer, Brazil

Municipality name disambiguation pages